Crassostrea rhizophorae is a species of bivalves belonging to the family Ostreidae.

The species is found in Central and South America.

References

rhizophorae